Schloss Johannesburg (Castle Johannesburg) or variant, may refer to:

 Schloss Johannesberg aka Jánský vrch, a German castle in Czech Silesia
 Schloss Johannisburg, a castle in Aschaffenburg, Germany
 Schloss Johannisberg, a castle in Hesse, Germany
 Johannisborg, a castle in Sweden, see List of castles and manor houses in Sweden
 the remains of Johannisborg, see Listed buildings in Östergötland County

See also
Johannesburg (disambiguation)